The 2018–19 Bundesliga was the 77th season of the Bundesliga, Germany's highest field hockey league. It began on 25 August 2019 and it concluded with the championship final on 19 May 2019 in Krefeld.

Uhlenhorst Mülheim were the defending champions, and won their 18th Bundesliga title by defeating Mannheimer HC 5–4 in the final.

Teams

Twelve teams competed in the league – the top ten teams from the previous season and the two teams promoted from the 2. Bundesliga. The promoted teams were Hamburger Polo Club and Blau-Weiss Berlin, who replaced TSV Mannheim and Münchner SC.

Number of teams by state

Regular season

League table

Results

Play-offs
The championship play-offs were held at the Gerd-Wellen-Hockeystadion in Krefeld on 18 and 19 May 2019.

Semi-finals

Final

Statistics

Top goalscorers

References

External links
Official website
Flashscore page

Feldhockey Bundesliga (Men's field hockey)
Germany
Feldhockey-Bundesliga 2017–18
Feldhockey-Bundesliga 2017–18